Anthony Richard Anstead (born March 1979) is an English television presenter, motor specialist, car builder, designer and artist, best known for co-presenting the Channel 4 automotive show For the Love of Cars with Philip Glenister. In 2017 Anstead took over from Edd China as co-host of the show Wheeler Dealers, alongside Mike Brewer.

Early life
Anstead was born in Plymouth, Devon, England. He lived in Ely, Cambridgeshire, until the age of ten, then moved with his family to Hertfordshire. He was educated at Richard Hale School, Hertford, and then attended the nearby Haileybury School to complete his A-levels.

Early career 
Anstead joined Hertfordshire Constabulary in 1999 and became a Police Constable first stationed at Bishop's Stortford. He moved to Cheshunt police station and then became a member of the Tactical Firearms Team (TFU) in Welwyn Garden City. During his police career, Anstead received two commendations for acts of bravery.

In 2005 Anstead resigned from the Police to pursue a career as a car builder. He started building and restoring cars for clients and built recreation cars and one-offs.

He also built unique pieces of art and sculpture and many of his works are housed globally in museums and private collections.

Anstead played semi-professional football for over 15 years playing over 700 matches at Ryman level, and made the transition from goalkeeper to striker, most notably becoming the only player to win Ryman league promotions in both positions.

Television career
Anstead started his own television production company in 2014, producing his own show The World’s Most Expensive Cars.

In 2014, he was approached to host a new Channel 4 car show with British actor Philip Glenister. Since then Anstead has hosted a number of television shows and in 2015, Anstead hosted BBC Two's live show Building Cars Live, alongside James May and Kate Humble.

Anstead hosts the live stages of some of UK's car shows as well as after dinner speaking and motivational speaking in schools and charities.

In his 2019 TV show Ant Anstead Master Mechanic, Anstead uses a variety of components, from spare parts to donor cars to hand-build an homage to the Alfa Romeo 158. The show sees Anstead work with a variety of automotive personalities and experts in the field.

In addition to Master Mechanic, Anstead is also part of the new 'World's Greatest Cars' series. The new show sees a panel of motoring experts cover the five greatest sports cars ever made. The cars are evaluated on their iconic designs and game-changing performance.

Wheeler Dealers 
In 2017, Anstead replaced Edd China as co-host of Wheeler Dealers. In November 2020, Anstead revealed he would be leaving the show a month after announcing his divorce from wife Christina Anstead, as the series returned to filming in the UK.

Personal life
Anstead has a daughter and son with his first wife Louise. They divorced in 2017.

He began dating American television personality Christina Haack in October 2017. On 22 December 2018, they married at their Newport Beach, California home. Together they have a son, born in September 2019. They announced their separation on September 18, 2020.

Seven months after his split from Haack, in April 2021, he began dating American actress Renée Zellweger.

Anstead is patron of Harrison's Fund, a charity that supports research into Duchenne muscular dystrophy.

Filmography

Television

Bibliography 

 Cops and Robbers: The Story of the British Police Car, HarperCollins UK, 2018, 
 Petrol Head Parenting: The Essential Guide to Diagnosing and Nurturing a Petrol Head, Great Flood Publishing, 2018,

References

External links 
 
 

English television presenters
Living people
1979 births
Hertfordshire Constabulary officers
Mass media people from Plymouth, Devon